Mwadingusha is a community in the Kambove Territory of Haut Katanga District in the Democratic Republic of the Congo.

Hydroelectricity

The river was dammed at the falls in 1925 with an  dyke to form Lake Tshangalele, a reservoir for a hydroelectric generator supplying power for copper smelting in Likasi.
The newly formed Société Générale des Forces Hydro-électriques du Katanga  (SOGEFOR) undertook construction over a four-year period, with most of the work done by large crews of laborers.
The Emil Francqui power station was built to harness the power.
It had six turbo-generators, five active at any time, and a generating capacity of 60,000 kilowatts.

Lake

References

Sources

 
 
 
 

Haut-Katanga Province
Populated places in Haut-Katanga Province